Flowood is a city in Rankin County, Mississippi, United States. The population was 10,202 at the 2020 U.S. Census. It is part of the Jackson Metropolitan Statistical Area.

History
In 1950, a delegation from Flowood petitioned Governor Fielding L. Wright to incorporate the community.  Despite opposition, Flowood's incorporation was upheld by the Mississippi Supreme Court in 1953.  

In June 2009, Flowood voters approved (by a 75% to 25% margin) being classified as a resort area that allows liquor by the glass in restaurants and hotels, coming out from under a dry county.

Geography

Demographics

2020 census

As of the 2020 United States census, there were 10,202 people, 3,626 households, and 2,338 families residing in the city.

2000 census
As of the census of 2000, there were 4,750 people, 2,130 households, and 1,145 families residing in the city. The population density was 291.7 people per square mile (112.7/km2). There were 2,371 housing units at an average density of 145.6 per square mile (56.2/km2). The racial makeup of the city was 79.92% White, 16.63% African American, 0.17% Native American, 1.89% Asian, 0.06% Pacific Islander, 0.61% from other races, and 0.72% from two or more races. Hispanic or Latino of any race were 1.77% of the population.

There were 2,130 households, out of which 29.0% had children under the age of 18 living with them, 39.8% were married couples living together,1.7% of households consisted of unmarried partners, 10.5% had a female householder with no husband present, and 46.2% were non-families. 35.0% of all households were made up of individuals, and 3.1% had someone living alone who was 65 years of age or older. The average household size was 2.23 and the average family size was 2.99.

In the city, the population was spread out, with 23.5% under the age of 18, 16.1% from 18 to 24, 41.0% from 25 to 44, 15.1% from 45 to 64, and 4.4% who were 65 years of age or older. The median age was 29 years. For every 100 females, there were 90.6 males. For every 100 females age 18 and over, there were 92.0 males.

The median income for a household in the city was $40,333, and the median income for a family was $49,767. Males had a median income of $37,500 versus $29,773 for females. The per capita income for the city was $21,875. About 10.3% of families and 13.9% of the population were below the poverty line, including 16.6% of those under age 18 and 9.2% of those age 65 or over.

Economy
Flowood is the location of the National Weather Service office that serves the Jackson area.

Parks and recreation
Flowood has an indoor track for remote control racing.  Opened in 2010, it is the first "permanent city owned indoor off road remote control race track" in the United States.

Education
The City of Flowood's public schools are served by the Rankin County School District.

Public schools
 Northwest Rankin High School (Grades 9-12)
 Northwest Rankin Middle School (Grades 7-8)
 Flowood Elementary School (Grades K-6)
 Northshore Elementary School (Grades K-6)
 Northwest Rankin Elementary School (Grades K-6)
 Oakdale Elementary School (Grades K-6)
 Highland Bluff Elementary School (Grades K-6)

Private schools
 Jackson Preparatory School, also known as Jackson Prep
 Hartfield Academy, previously known as University Christian School

Colleges and universities
 The University of Phoenix's sole Mississippi campus is located in Flowood.

Notable people
 Kyle Carpenter, a retired United States Marine who received in 2014 the United States' highest military honor, the Medal of Honor for his actions in Marjah, Helmand Province, Afghanistan in 2010. Carpenter is the youngest currently living Medal of Honor recipient.
 Chris Epps, the former head of the Mississippi Department of Corrections
 J.T. Ginn, minor league pitcher for the New York Mets.
Josh Harkins, Republican member of the Mississippi State Senate.
 Chris Dowling, film director and screenwriter.
Gardner Minshew, Quarterback for the Philadelphia Eagles. 
Jake Mangum, outfielder in the Miami Marlins organization.

See also
 Airport Parkway
 Jackson metropolitan area

References

External links
 City of Flowood Website
 The Chamber of Flowood

Cities in Mississippi
Cities in Rankin County, Mississippi
Jackson metropolitan area, Mississippi